Molossia, officially the Republic of Molossia is a micronation claiming sovereignty over  of land near Dayton, Nevada. The micronation has not received recognition from any of the member states of the United Nations. It was founded by Kevin Baugh. He continues to pay property taxes on the land to Storey County (the recognized local government), although he calls it "foreign aid". He has stated "We all want to think we have our own country, but you know the U.S. is a lot bigger".

History

Molossia started as a teenage dream of Kevin Baugh, and began, as the Kingdom of Molossia, in 1998 when he bought land in Nevada. Baugh has claimed that he based the idea of Molossia on the film The Mouse That Roared, and also claims influence from his time in the military.

Geography and climate
The Republic of Molossia is situated in the Great Basin, the largest arid region in North America. The terrain consists of dry, rocky or sandy soil. Molossia is situated in the Dayton Valley, near the Carson River. The area occupied by Molossia experiences a dry-summer or Mediterranean climate.

Military history

The Republic of Molossia claims to be at war with the former state of East Germany, alleging that they are responsible for military drills performed by Kevin Baugh while stationed with the United States Military in West Germany, and therefore are also responsible for the resulting diagnosis of sleep deprivation. While East Germany formally ceased to exist in 1990 following the Treaty on the Final Settlement with Respect to Germany, Molossia argues that Ernst Thälmann Island, dedicated by Fidel Castro to Weimar German politician Ernst Thälmann and given to East Germany, as well as its lack of mention in the Treaty on the Final Settlement or by the nation of Cuba, is therefore still East German land, allowing the war to continue.

National anthem
Molossia has changed its national anthem twice. The first anthem was based on the Romanian patriotic song "Pe-al nostru steag e scris Unire," which was named "Molossia, Nation in the Desert." In 2014, the anthem was changed again to the music of "La Zaïroise" (the national anthem of Zaire) and was renamed to "Fair Molossia is Our Home" to mark the 15th anniversary of its independence.

National symbols
Molossia's flag is a horizontal tricolor flag of blue, white, and green. The blue bar represents the nation's strength and the desert sky, the white bar represents purity and the surrounding mountains, and the green bar represents prosperity and the Molossian landscape. To save on costs of producing custom-made flags, Molossia typically uses upside-down flags of Sierra Leone.

Other national symbols of Molossia include the mustang, the national animal; the desert quail, the national bird; and the common juniper and common sagebrush, Molossia's national tree and flower, respectively.

It is the origin of the Molossolini, a non-alcoholic mixed drink of Sprite, grenadine, and pineapple juice, with added cherries and slices of banana, orange, and pineapple.

In popular culture 
In 2010, the Republic of Molossia was featured in a feature-length special by Channel Awesome called Kickassia. In the film, the Republic undergoes an invasion by the Nostalgia Critic (played by Doug Walker) and his posse of reviewers, who briefly replace Molossia with "Kickassia" before being ousted.

See also

 List of micronations
 Micronations: The Lonely Planet Guide to Home-Made Nations

Footnotes

Notes

References

Further reading

 "In The Spirit Of Independence Day - One nation, under me", The Chicago Tribune, Colleen Mastoni, July 3, 2008.
 Ryan, John. Micronations: The Lonely Planet Guide to Self-Proclaimed Nations, .
 iBerkshires Bite-sized sovereignties offer worlds of fun. February 2, 2005.
Micronations: Republic of Molossia, Unrecognised States Numismatic Society, 2006.
 Micronations: Little Countries that Could, G4TV, Dave Roos, June 8, 2001.
 "Born to rule", The Australian, Peter Needham, September 16, 2006.
 "State of the nation", San Francisco Bay Guardian, Lynn Rapoport, February 28, 2007.
http://www.molossia.org/navy/index.html Republic of Molossia Navy official webpage.

External links

 
 
 
 The Republic of Molossia @ YouTube

1999 establishments in Nevada
Micronations in the United States
States and territories established in 1999
History of Nevada
Geography of Nevada
Storey County, Nevada
Micronations